Caroline Morahan is an Irish actress and television host. In 2010, she was chosen as the face of Littlewoods Ireland.

Early life
Caroline Morahan graduated from Dublin City University with a Bachelor of Arts in communication studies, earning first class honors for her photographic thesis. During her university years she appeared in numerous short films and television pilots.

In September 2012, she married Dáithí Ó Caoimh. They have two children, Rowan and Ava.

Career
In 1994, she made her television debut, at the age of 17, in soap opera Fair City as Barbara Cleary. In 2001, Morahan entered the reality TV series The Selection Box and was chosen from an open call of 2,000 to host The Fame Game. She hosted the show for five seasons. Later, she co-hosted the fashion programme Off the Rails from 2002 to 2007. Morahan left Off the Rails in 2007 to move back to acting.

She has guest hosted and appeared in a multitude of Irish television programmes, including The Panel, The Restaurant, The Late Late Show, Tubridy Tonight, Xposé, The Den, and The Health Squad. A guest appearance on The Podge and Rodge Show in 2008 led to the role of host in early 2009. She has appeared as the female lead in the Irish musical, I, Keano.

In 2009, she moved to Los Angeles, California to pursue acting career in Hollywood.

Awards
In 2009, she was voted Sexiest TV Presenter in a poll by entertainment.ie.

Filmography

Film

Axis (voice) (2017)
Mr. Thursday (2016)
Lost & Found (2015)
I Can't See You Anymore (2012)
Howard Cantour.com (2012)
Lionhead (2012)
A Kiss for Jed (2011)
What About Love (2020)

Television

 The World's Best CBS (2019) - International judge
 "Disjointed" Netflix original series (2018) - DD
Fir Bolg (2016)
The Real O'Neals ABC (2016)
Once Upon a Time ABC (2015) - Queen Elinor
Big Mike (2011)
The Cosmetic Surgery Show (2010)
The Podge and Rodge Show (2008–2009)
Winning Streak (2008) – charity special
Class Act – (2008) - judge
 Telethon (2008) – guest host and sang for charity
IFTAs Red Carpet Show (2008)
It's My Show (2007, 2008) - judge
The Afternoon Show (2007) – guest host
Off the Rails (2002–2007)
 O2 in the Park (2005)
Chance to Dance (2005)
The Restaurant (2005)
Karl Spain Wants a Woman (2005) - stylist
The Health Squad (2004)
The Panel (2003, 2005)
Close Encounters with Keith Barry (2003) - participant
Beyond the Hall Door (2003) – guest host
Fame Game on the Run (2003)
The Fame Game (2001–2003)
Fair City (1992) - Barbara Cleary

Theatre
Looking at the Sun (2022) 
Private Eyes (2016)
The Weir (2015)
She Stoops to Conquer (2014)
Anglo: The Musical (2013)
Pity the Proud Ones (2011)
I, Keano (2008)

Web

 MSN Lifestyle - The Surf Report (2010) 
Doctor Who - Alternate Empire (2009) - Samantha

Radio

2FM Breakfast Show (2008)

References

External links
 Official website
 

Living people
Alumni of Dublin City University
Irish expatriates in the United States
Irish film actresses
Irish stage actresses
Irish television actresses
People from County Dublin
RTÉ 2fm presenters
RTÉ television presenters
Irish women radio presenters
Irish women television presenters
1977 births